The Oromo War is an ongoing armed conflict in Ethiopia, between the Oromo Liberation Army (OLA), which split from the Oromo Liberation Front (OLF) in 2018, and the Ethiopian National Defense Force (ENDF), continuing in the context of the long-term Oromo conflict, typically dated to have started with the formation of the Oromo Liberation Front in 1973.

References

Conflicts in 2018
Wars involving Ethiopia
Ethiopian Civil War